The Travelling Vampire Show is a 2000 horror novel by American author Richard Laymon.

Plot
The book follows three 16-year-olds on an idle summer day in 1963. The narrator, Dwight, and his best friends Rusty and Slim (a tomboy), find flyers for an exotic vampire show. They make a journey to a local clearing called Jank's Field in an attempt to sneak a peek at Valeria, who is billed as the world's only living captive vampire, but they are attacked by a dog and separated, leading to a series of misadventures. Meanwhile, Dwight's attractive sister-in-law Lee purchases four tickets from the show's frontman, Julian Stryker. Later that night the group is reunited and attends the titular Vampire Show, where they discover a sinister plot involving the vampires.

The book focuses on the interactions between the three teens and their sexual awakening.

Publication
The first run of the book included two special limited editions. A signed limited edition hardcover (1000 copies) had the same production values as the hardcover and included a signature sheet. The
traycased lettered edition (26 copies) was signed and lettered, and bound in leather with a satin ribbon page marker and additional full-color artwork. Lettered, limited editions are marked A-Z instead of numerically, and limited to 26 copies.  Each book was enclosed in a traycase, a clam shell construction which completely encased the book, a key feature which separates lettered editions from numbered editions.

Reception
The book was one of Laymon's more popular novels and won a posthumous Bram Stoker Award for best novel in 2001. A starred review from Publishers Weekly praised the novel for its "emphasis on atmosphere" specifically pointing out the social and sexual tensions among the three teens.

References

2000 American novels
American horror novels
American vampire novels
Novels by Richard Laymon
Fiction set in 1963
American bildungsromans
Bram Stoker Award for Novel winners
Cemetery Dance Publications books